Childia is a genus of acoels in the family Mecynostomidae.

Species
Contains the following species:
 Childia aculifera Nilsson, Wallberg & Jondelius, 2011
 Childia brachyposthium (Westblad 1942)
 Childia crassum (Westblad 1942)
 Childia curinii Nilsson, Wallberg & Jondelius, 2011
 Childia cycloposthium (Westblad 1942)
 Childia dubium (Westblad 1942)
 Childia etium (Marcus 1954)
 Childia gracilis (Westblad 1945)
 Childia groenlandica (Levinsen, 1879)
 Childia leptoposthium (Riedl 1956)
 Childia macroposthium (Steinböck, 1931)
 Childia submaculatum (Westblad 1942)
 Childia trianguliferum (Westblad 1942)
 Childia vivipara Tekle, Raikova & Jondelius, 2006
 Childia westbladi (Marcus 1950)

References

Acoelomorphs